Oncidium, abbreviated as Onc. in the horticultural trade, is a genus that contains about 330 species of orchids from the subtribe Oncidiinae of the orchid family (Orchidaceae). As presently conceived (May 2014), it is distributed across much of South America, Central America, Mexico and the West Indies, with one species (O. ensatum) extending into Florida. Common names for plants in this genus include dancing-lady orchid and golden shower orchid.

In 2008, Oxfords Annals of Botany labeled the Oncidium alliance "grossly polyphyletic." The American Orchid Society labeled this genus a "dumping ground." After DNA testing and much debate, a consensus was announced (April 2013) resulting in major taxonomic changes to Oncidium, Gomesa, Odontoglossum, Miltonia, and others. Much of this debate and subsequent housekeeping was initiated by significant research for the scientific publication Genera Orchidacearum Volume 5. As a result, much of the information in this article is now deprecated, but still of great value. One significant change is the move of most Brazilian Oncidium with a fused lateral sepal to the genus Gomesa. The Royal Horticultural Society system, the World Checklist of Monocots database and the American Orchid Society have already updated their databases to reflect most of these changes.

Description

This genus was first described by Olof Swartz in 1800 with the orchid Oncidium altissimum, which has become the type species. Its name is derived from the Greek word ὀγκος, onkos, meaning "swelling". This refers to the callus at the lower lip.

Most species in the genus are epiphytes (growing on other plants), although some are lithophytes (growing on rocks) or terrestrials (growing in soil). They are widespread from northern Mexico, the Caribbean, and some parts of South Florida to South America. They usually occur in seasonally dry areas.

They can be divided into three categories, according to their growth pattern:
 Some have green pseudobulbs and long racemes with small flowers and a dominant lip. They are mostly golden yellow with or without reddish-brown barring, but some are brown or yellowish-brown. Other Oncidium species have white and pink blooms, while some even have startling, deep red colors in their flowers.
 Another group has extremely small pseudobulbs and stiff, erect, solitary leaves. These cylindrical leaves act as a water reserve. They have long racemes with yellow flowers that seem to fan out at the top. Sizes of these orchids can vary from miniature plants of a couple of centimetres to giants with 30 cm-long leaves and racemes of more than one metre long. These species, known as the Mule-Ears, are now classed as Psychopsis.
 Formerly there was a third group, called the Variegata or equitant oncidiums. They have no pseudobulbs, giving fan-shaped shoots of less than 15 cm, with triangular section leaves. These oval, broad and spongy leaves act as storage organs. Their flowers are most complicated with exquisite colors. The sepals are somewhat fleshy. The petals and the lip are membranaceous. These orchids are now classified as Tolumnia. Cyrtochilum is another genus that many Oncidium species have recently been reclassified into; Cyrtochilum species have extremely long, winding inflorescences that can sometimes reach 20' or more, curled petals that result in three-pointed blooms, and rambling growth habits in which each new pseudobulb appears on top of the old one.

Oncidium species are characterised by the following properties :
 presence of column wings,
 presence of a complicated callus on the lip (this can be used to separate the taxa),
 pseudobulbs with one to three leaves,
 several basal bracts at the base of the pseudobulbs.

The flowers come in shades of yellow, red, white and pink. The petals are often ruffled on the edges, as is the lip. The lip is enormous, partially blocking the small petals and sepals.

Some Oncidium orchids are very long : Oncidum altissimum and Oncidium baueri can grow to a height of 5 m, while Oncidum sarcodes can reach 3 m.

They are known as 'spray orchids' among some florists. They are very varied and are easily hybridised with Odontoglossum. Together with other closely related genera (Miltonia, Cuitlauzina, Miltoniopsis, Osmoglossum, Leochilus, Comparettia, Cyrtochilum, Odontoglossum, Tolumnia, Rhynchostele [formerly Lemboglossum], Psychopsis, etc.) they form the Oncidium alliance. Some of the best Oncidium alliance hybrids originate from Oncidium tigrinum and Oncidium incurvum, when crossed with Odontoglossums, although hybridization possibilities of this group of orchids are endless, and there are literally hundreds of thousands of excellent hybrids in the Oncidium alliance.

Selected species
 Oncidium aberrans (Brazil - Paraná).
 Oncidium abortivum (Venezuela to Ecuador).
 Oncidium abruptum (Colombia to Ecuador).
 Oncidium acinaceum (Ecuador to Peru).
 Oncidium acrochordonia (Colombia).
 Oncidium adelaidae (Colombia).
 Oncidium advena (N. Venezuela).
 Oncidium albini (Brazil - Paraná).
 Oncidium alcicorne (Colombia).
 Oncidium allenii (Panama).
 Oncidium aloisii (Ecuador).
 Oncidium altissimum : "Wydler's dancing-lady orchid" (Jamaica).
 Oncidium amabile (Brazil).
 Oncidium amictum (SE. Brazil).
 Oncidium amoenum (Mexico).
 Oncidium ampliatumLindl. (Panama) (now a synonym of the accepted name Chelyorchis ampliata (Lindl.) Dressler & N.H.Williams in G.A.Romero & G.Carnevali, 2000 )
 Oncidium andradeanum (Ecuador to Peru).
 Oncidium andreae (Colombia).
 Oncidium andreanum (SW. Mexico).
 Oncidium angustisegmentum (Peru).
 Oncidium × ann-hadderae (O. haitiense × O. variegatum) (Dominican Republic).
 Oncidium anomalum (Colombia).
 Oncidium ansiferum (C. America to Colombia).
 Oncidium anthocrene (Colombia to Ecuador).
 Oncidium antioquiense (Colombia).
 Oncidium ariasii (Peru).
 Oncidium arizajulianum (Dominican Republic) (now synonym of Tolumnia arizajuliana)
 Oncidium armillare (W. South America to N. Venezuela).
 Oncidium aspecum (Peru).
 Oncidium auricula (SE. Brazil).
 Oncidium auriferum (Colombia to NW. Venezuela).
 Oncidium aurorae (Peru).
 Oncidium ayabacanum (Peru).
 Oncidium baccatum (Venezuela).
 Oncidium bahiense (Cogn.) Schltr (NE Brasil)
 Oncidium barbaceniae (Brazil - Minas Gerais).

 Oncidium barbatum (Brazil to Bolivia).
 Oncidium batemanianum (Brazil to Peru).
 Oncidium baueri (Trop. America).
 Oncidium bennettii (Peru).
 Oncidium bicolor (NE. Venezuela to Brazil).
 Oncidium bidentatum (Ecuador).
 Oncidium bifolium (Brazil to N. Argentina).
 Oncidium blanchetii (E. & S. Brazil.).
 Oncidium boothianum (Venezuela to Ecuador).
 Oncidium brachyandrum (Mexico)
 Oncidium brachystachys (Colombia).
 Oncidium brachystegium (Bolivia).
 Oncidium bracteatum (Costa Rica to Colombia).
 Oncidium braunii (Trop. America) (?).
 Oncidium brevilabrum (Colombia.
 Oncidium brunleesianum (Brazil - Rio de Janeiro).
 Oncidium brunnipetalum (S. Brazil).
 Oncidium bryocladium (Colombia).

 Oncidium bryolophotum (Costa Rica to Panama).
 Oncidium buchtienii (Bolivia).
 Oncidium bustosii Königer (Ecuador)
 Oncidium calanthum (Ecuador to Peru).
 Oncidium callistum (Colombia).
 Oncidium calochilum (Cayman Is., Cuba, Dominican Republic) (now synonym of Tolumnia calochila)
 Oncidium caminiophorum (N. Venezuela).
 Oncidium cardiostigma (Mexico).
 Oncidium × cassolanum (O. cornigerum × O. riograndense) (S. Brazil).
 Oncidium caucanum (Colombia).
 Oncidium cebolleta (Mexico to Brazil) (synonym of the accepted name : Trichocentrum cebolleta (Jacq.) M.W.Chase & N.H.Williams, 2001 
 Oncidium chapadense (Brazil - Goiás).
 Oncidium cheirophorum (Mexico - Chiapas to Colombia).
 Oncidium chrysomorphum (Colombia to N. Venezuela).
 Oncidium chrysops (Mexico - Guerrero, Oaxaca).
 Oncidium chrysopteranthum (Brazil).
 Oncidium chrysopterum (WC. Brazil to Bolivia).
 Oncidium chrysothyrsus (SE. Brazil)
 Oncidium ciliatum (SE. Brazil).

 Oncidium citrinum (Trinidad to Venezuela).
 Oncidium cogniauxianum (SE. Brazil).
 Oncidium × colnagoi. (O. forbesii × O.) (SE. Brazil).
 Oncidium coloratum (Brazil - Espírito Santo) (now synonym of Carria colorata (Königer & J.G.Weinm.bis) V.P.Castro & K.G.Lacerda 2005)
 Oncidium compressicaule (Haiti) (now synonym of Tolumnia compressicaulis)
 Oncidium concolor (Brazil to NE. Argentina).
 Oncidium cornigerum (SE. & S. Brazil to Paraguay).
 Oncidium crassopterum (Peru).
 Oncidium crispum (SE. Brazil).
 Oncidium cristatellum (Brazil to Ecuador).
 Oncidium croesus (Brazil - Rio de Janeiro).
 Oncidium cruciferum (Peru).
 Oncidium cultratum (Ecuador).
 Oncidium curtum (Brazil - Rio de Janeiro).

 Oncidium cycnicolle (Colombia to Ecuador).
 Oncidium dactyliferum (Venezuela to Ecuador).
 Oncidium dactylopterum (Colombia).
 Oncidium dasytyle (Brazil - Rio de Janeiro).
 Oncidium decorum (Colombia).
 Oncidium deltoideum (N. Peru).
 Oncidium dichromaticum (Costa Rica to Colombia).
 Oncidium disciferum (Bolivia).
 Oncidium discobulbon (Peru).
 Oncidium divaricatum (SE. Brazil).
 Oncidium donianum (Brazil - São Paulo).
 Oncidium drepanopterum (Ecuador).
 Oncidium durangense (Mexico - Durango).
 Oncidium duveenii (Brazil).
 Oncidium echinophorum (Brazil - Rio de Janeiro).
 Oncidium echinops (Ecuador).
 Oncidium edmundoi (Brazil).

 Oncidium edwallii (Brazil to NE. Argentina).
 Oncidium elephantotis (NW. Venezuela to Ecuador).
 Oncidium emilii (Paraguay).
 Oncidium enderianum (SE. Brazil).
 Oncidium endocharis (Mexico - Chiapas to C. America).
 Oncidium ensatum : (S. Mexico, Belize, Cuba, Florida, Bahamas, NW. Venezuela).
 Oncidium erucatum (Ecuador).
 Oncidium estradae (Ecuador).
 Oncidium eurycline (SE. Brazil).
 Oncidium exalatum (Panama).
 Oncidium exasperatoides (Peru).
 Oncidium excavatum (C. America to Peru)., moved to Vitekorchis excavata (Romowicz & Szlach., 2006)
 Oncidium falcipetalum (Venezuela)
 Oncidium fasciculatum (Mexico - Oaxaca, Chiapas to Guatemala).
 Oncidium fasciferum (Peru).
 Oncidium fimbriatum (Brazil to NE. Argentina).
 Oncidium flexuosum (E. & S. Brazil to NC. Argentina).
 Oncidium floridanum : syn of O. ensatum
 Oncidium × floride-phillipsae (O. prionochilum × O. variegatum) (Leeward Is.).
 Oncidium forbesii (Brazil - Minas Gerais).
 Oncidium formosissimum (Ecuador to Peru).
 Oncidium fragae (Brazil - Rio de Janeiro).
 Oncidium fuscans (Brazil - Minas Gerais).
 Oncidium fuscatum (Ecuador to Peru).
 Oncidium fuscopetalum (WC. Brazil).

 Oncidium gardneri (Ecuador, SE. Brazil).
 Oncidium × gardstyle (O. dasystyle × O. gardneri) (Brazil - Rio de Janeiro).
 Oncidium gauntlettii (Jamaica) (now synonym of Tolumnia gauntlettii)
 Oncidium geertianum (C. & SW. Mexico).
 Oncidium gilvum (SE. Brazil).
 Oncidium gracile (SE. Brazil).
 Oncidium graciliforme (C.Panama).
 Oncidium gracillimum (Colombia).
 Oncidium graminifolium (Mexico to C. America).
 Oncidium gravesianum (E. Brazil).
 Oncidium guianense (Hispaniola) (now synonym of Tolumnia guianensis)
 Oncidium guibertianum (Cuba) (now synonym of Tolumnia guibertiana)
 Oncidium guttatum (Mexico to Colombia and Caribbean) (now synonym of Tolumnia guttata)
 Oncidium gyrobulbon (Ecuador).
 Oncidium hagsaterianum (Mexico to Guatemala).
 Oncidium haitiense (Hispaniola) (now synonym of Tolumnia haitensis)
 Oncidium hannelorae (Windward Is.-(Dominica).
 Oncidium hapalotyle (Colombia to Ecuador).
 Oncidium harrisonianum (SE. Brazil). 
 Oncidium harryanum (Columbia).
 Oncidium hastatum (Mexico).
 Oncidium hastilabium (W. South America).
 Oncidium hatschbachii (Brazil - Paraná).

 Oncidium helgae (Ecuador).
 Oncidium herzogii (Bolivia to NW. Argentina).
 Oncidium heteranthum (S. Trop. America).
 Oncidium hians (Peru, SE. Brazil).
 Oncidium hieroglyphicum (Peru).
 Oncidium hintonii (N. & SW. Mexico).
 Oncidium hirtzii (Ecuador – Napo).
 Oncidium hookeri (SE. & S. Brazil.
 Oncidium hydrophilum (Brazil to Paraguay).
 Oncidium hyphaematicum (W. South America).
 Oncidium imitans (Costa Rica).
 Oncidium imperatoris-maximiliani (Brazil - Rio de Janeiro).
 Oncidium incurvum (Mexico - Veracruz to Chiapas).

 Oncidium inouei (Peru).
 Oncidium insigne (Brazil).
 Oncidium ionopterum (Peru - Cajamarca).
 Oncidium iricolor (Trop. America) (?).
 Oncidium isidrense (Peru).
 Oncidium isopterum (Brazil - Minas Gerais).
 Oncidium isthmii (Costa Rica to Panama).
 Oncidium kautskyi (Brazil).
 Oncidium klotzschianum (Costa Rica to Venezuela and Peru).
 Oncidium kraenzlinianum (Brazil).
 Oncidium kramerianum (Costa Rica to Suriname and Ecuador) (now synonym of Psychopsis krameriana)
 Oncidium lancifolium (Ecuador).
 Oncidium leinigii (Brazil).
 Oncidium leleui (SW. Mexico).
 Oncidium lentiginosum (Colombia to N. Venezuela).
 Oncidium leopardinum (Peru).
 Oncidium lepidum (Ecuador).

 Oncidium lepturum (Bolivia).
 Oncidium leucochilum (SE. Mexico to Guatemala).
 Oncidium lietzei (SE. Brazil).
 Oncidium ligiae (Colombia).
 Oncidium lindleyi (S. Mexico to Guatemala).
 Oncidium lineoligerum (N. Peru).
 Oncidium litum (SE. Brazil).
 Oncidium loechiloides (Venezuela).
 Oncidium loefgrenii (SE. & S. Brazil).
 Oncidium longicornu (Brazil to NE. Argentina.
 Oncidium longipes (Brazil to NE. Argentina).
 Oncidium lucasianum (Peru - Cajamarca).
 Oncidium lucayanum (Bahamas) (now synonym of Tolumnia lucayana)
 Oncidium luteum (Costa Rica).
 Oncidium lykaiosii (Bolivia).
 Oncidium macronyx (Brazil).
 Oncidium macropetalum (W.C. Brazil)
 Oncidium maculatum (Mexico to C. America).
 Oncidium maculosum (Brazil - Minas Gerais).
 Oncidium magdalenae (NW. Venezuela - Mérida).
 Oncidium maizifolium (Colombia to NW. Venezuela).
 Oncidium majevskyi (Brazil).
 Oncidium mantense Dodson & R.Estrada (Ecuador)
 Oncidium mandonii (Bolivia).
 Oncidium marshallianum (SE. Brazil).
 Oncidium martianum (SE. & S. Brazil).
 Oncidium mathieuanum (Ecuador to Peru).
 Oncidium megalopterum (SE. Brazil).
 Oncidium melanops (Ecuador).
 Oncidium micropogon (Brazil).
 Oncidium micropogon var. micropogon (S. Brazil). Pseudobulb epiphyte
 Oncidium microstigma (C. & SW. Mexico).
 Oncidium millianum (Colombia).
 Oncidium miserrimum (Colombia to NW. Venezuela).
 Oncidium morenoi (Brazil) (replaced synonym of the accepted name Trichocentrum morenoi (Dodson & Luer) M.W.Chase & N.H.Williams, 2001 ).
 Oncidium naevium (Colombia to Guyana).
 Oncidium nebulosum (Colombia).
 Oncidium niesseniae (Colombia).
 Oncidium nigratum (Colombia to Guyana).
 Oncidium noezlianum (N. Peru to Bolivia).
 Oncidium obryzatoides (Costa Rica to Ecuador).
 Oncidium ochmatochilum (SE. Mexico to Peru).

 Oncidium ochthodes (Ecuador).
 Oncidium oliganthum (Mexico - Oaxaca, Chiapas to El Salvador).
 Oncidium orbatum (Colombia).
 Oncidium ornithocephalum (Colombia).
 Oncidium ornithopodum (Trop. America).
 Oncidium ornithorhynchum (Mexico to C. America).
 Oncidium orthostates (S. Venezuela to Guyana and Brazil). This species has been redefined as Nohawilliamsia pirarense (Rchb. f.), M.W. Chase & Whitten 
 Oncidium orthostatoides (Peru).
 Oncidium ototmeton (Bolivia).
 Oncidium ouricanense (Brazil - Bahia).
 Oncidium panamense (Panama).
 Oncidium panduratum (Colombia.
 Oncidium panduriforme (Costa Rica).
 Oncidium papilio (Panama to S. Trop. America and Trinidad) (now synonym of Psychopsis papilio)
 Oncidium paranaense (Brazil to Argentina - Misiones).
 Oncidium paranapiacabense (Brazil - São Paulo).
 Oncidium pardalis (N. Venezuela).
 Oncidium pardoglossum (Trop. America) (?).
 Oncidium pardothyrsus (Ecuador to Peru).
 Oncidium parviflorum (Costa Rica to Panama).
 Oncidium pectorale (Brazil - Rio de Janeiro).
 Oncidium pelicanum (Mexico - Guerrero, Oaxaca).
 Oncidium peltiforme (Ecuador).
 Oncidium pentadactylon (W. South America).
 Oncidium pergameneum (NC. & SE. Mexico to C. America).
 Oncidium pictum (W. South America).
 Oncidium picturatum (N. Venezuela).
 Oncidium pirarene (Guyana).
 Oncidium planilabre (W. South America).
 Oncidium platychilum (Colombia to Ecuador).
 Oncidium platyglossum (Colombia).
 Oncidium pollardii (Mexico - Oaxaca).
 Oncidium polyadenium (Ecuador to N. Peru).
 Oncidium polyodontum (SE. Brazil).
 Oncidium portillae (Ecuador).
 Oncidium posadarum (Colombia).
 Oncidium powellii (Panama).
 Oncidium praetextum (SE. Brazil).
 Oncidium prionochilum (Puerto Rico to Virgin Is.) (now synonym of Tolumnia prionochila)
 Oncidium pubes (Colombia, SE. Brazil to NE. Argentina).
 Oncidium pulchellum (Jamaica) (now synonym of Tolumnia pulchella)
 Oncidium pulvinatum (Brazil to NE. Argentina).
 Oncidium punctulatum (Panama).
 Oncidium pyramidale (W. South America).
 Oncidium pyxidophorum (Trop. America) (?).
 Oncidium quadrilobum (Hispaniola) (now synonym of Tolumnia quadriloba)
 Oncidium raniferum (SE. Brazil).
 Oncidium reductum (Bolivia).
 Oncidium reflexum (SW. Mexico)
 Oncidium regentii V.P.Castro & G.F.Carr (2005) (Brazil)
 Oncidium reichenbachii (Colombia to NW. Venezuela).
 Oncidium remotiflorum (Brazil).
 Oncidium retusum (Peru).
 Oncidium rhinoceros (Trop. America) (?).
 Oncidium riograndense (S. Brazil to NE. Argentina.
 Oncidium riopalenqueanum (Ecuador).
 Oncidium riviereanum (Brazil).
 Oncidium robustissimum (Brazil).
 Oncidium rodrigoi (Colombia).
 Oncidium rostrans (Colombia).
 Oncidium rutkisii (Venezuela).
 Oncidium sanderae (Peru - Huánuco) (now synonym of Psychopsis sanderae)
 Oncidium sarcodes (SE. Brazil).
 Oncidium saxicola (Colombia).
 Oncidium schillerianum (Peru).
 Oncidium schmidtianum (Trop. America) (?).
 Oncidium schunkeanum (Brazil).
 Oncidium schwambachiae (Brazil).
 Oncidium sclerophyllum (Costa Rica).
 Oncidium × scullyi (O. curtum × O. gravesianum) (SE. Brazil).
 Oncidium sellowii (Brazil).
 Oncidium semele (Ecuador).
 Oncidium sessile (Venezuela to Peru).
 Oncidium silvanoi (Peru).
 Oncidium silvanum (Brazil).
 Oncidium spegazzinianum (Argentina - Misiones).
 Oncidium sphacelatum (Mexico to C. America, SE. Venezuela).
 Oncidium sphegiferum (Brazil - Rio de Janeiro).
 Oncidium stelligerum (SW. Mexico).
 Oncidium stenobulbon (Costa Rica).
 Oncidium stenotis (Costa Rica to Ecuador).
 Oncidium storkii (Costa Rica).
 Oncidium suave (C. & SW. Mexico, El Salvador).
 Oncidium subcruciforme (Belize), (Nicaragua).
 Oncidium suttonii (Mexico - Chiapas to El Salvador).
 Oncidium swartzii (Windward Is.- Martinique).
 Oncidium sylvestre (Cuba to Haiti) (now synonym of Tolumnia sylvestris)
 Oncidium tectum (Colombia).
 Oncidium tenellum (French Guiana).
 Oncidium tenuipes (Guatemala).
 Oncidium tetrotis (Colombia).
 Oncidium tigratum (Ecuador to Peru).
 Oncidium tigrinum (C. & SW. Mexico).
 Oncidium tipuloides (Peru).
 Oncidium toachicum (Ecuador).
 Oncidium trachycaulon (Colombia to Ecuador).
 Oncidium trichodes (N. Brazil).
 Oncidium trilobum (Peru).
 Oncidium trinasutum (Ecuador).
 Oncidium triquetrum (Jamaica) (now synonym of Tolumnia triquetra)
 Oncidium trulliferum (Brazil - Rio de Janeiro).
 Oncidium truncatum (Brazil - Mato Grosso).
 Oncidium tsubotae (Colombia).
 Oncidium tuerckheimii (Cuba to Hispaniola) (now synonym of Tolumnia tuerckheimii )
 Oncidium unguiculatum (C. & SW. Mexico).
 Oncidium unicolor (SE. Brazil).
 Oncidium uniflorum (SE. & S. Brazil).
 Oncidium urophyllum (Lesser Antilles) (now synonym of Tolumnia urophylla)
 Oncidium usneoides (Cuba) (now synonym of Tolumnia usneoides)
 Oncidium varicosum (Brazil to N. Argentina).

 Oncidium variegatum (S. Florida to Caribbean) (now synonym of Tolumnia variegata)
 Oncidium variegatum subsp. bahamense (S. Florida to Bahamas) (now synonym of Tolumnia bahamensis)
 Oncidium variegatum subsp. leiboldii (Cayman Is. to Cuba) (now synonym of Tolumnia leiboldii )
 Oncidium variegatum subsp. scandens (Haiti) (now synonym of Tolumnia scandens)
 Oncidium variegatum subsp. velutinum (Cuba) (now synonym of Tolumnia velutina)
 Oncidium vasquezii (Bolivia).
 Oncidium venustum (Brazil).
 Oncidium vernixium (Ecuador).
 Oncidium verrucosissimum (Paraguay to NE. Argentina).
 Oncidium versteegianum (Suriname to Ecuador) (now synonym of Psychopsis versteegiana)
 Oncidium viperinum (Bolivia to NW. Argentina).
 Oncidium virgulatum (Colombia to Ecuador).
 Oncidium volvox (NW. & N. Venezuela).
 Oncidium warmingii (S. Venezuela to Brazil).
 Oncidium warszewiczii (Costa Rica to Colombia).
 Oncidium weddellii (Bolivia).
 Oncidium welteri (Brazil - São Paulo).
 Oncidium wentworthianum (Mexico – Chiapas to El Salvador).
 Oncidium wheatleyanum (Brazil).
 Oncidium widgrenii (SE. & S. Brazil to Paraguay).
 Oncidium williamsii (Bolivia).
 Oncidium xanthocentron (Colombia).
 Oncidium xanthornis (NW. Venezuela to Ecuador).
 Oncidium zappii (Brazil).

See also
 × Miltonidium, a hybrid genus with at least one Oncidium ancestor
 × Oncostele, a hybrid genus with at least one Oncidium ancestor

References

 Harry Zelenko :The Pictorial Encyclopaedia of Oncidium (1997)
 Koniger, W. 2003. New species of the genera Masdevallia, Oncidium and Sigmatostalix. Arcula no. 12: 298–311.

External links
 
 

 
Oncidiinae genera
Epiphytic orchids
Taxa named by Olof Swartz